The Helicopter unit is the air support unit of the Serbian Police. The unit can trace its origin back to 1967 and was established in its present form in 2002. The unit is in the process of modernising its fleet with the addition of the Airbus Helicopters H145M and has also ordered the Airbus Helicopters H215.

History
The Milicija helicopter unit was founded in April 1967 when a Bell 47 J-2 was provided to the Republican Secretariat for Interior of the Socialist Republic of Serbia. The helicopter was donated by the Federal Geological Institute of the Socialist Federal Republic of Yugoslavia who had used it for geological exploration for uranium. 

From 1980, a number of new generation helicopters with jet engines enter serviced including the Bell AB-212, the Bell 206, Soko Gazelle and later the Aerospatiale AS365N Dauphin. 

When riots broke out in Kosovo and Metochia in 1989 and 1990, helicopters were used to break up the mass demonstrations by Albanians. AB-212s were used to transport special forces units to rebel strongholds.

The Federal Secretariat for Interior established a helicopter squadron during the 1960s acquiring a number of helicopters. This squadron was dissolved in 1992 and integrated into the Republican Secretariat for Interior Milicija Helicopter Unit. 

In 1992, the Ministry of Internal Affairs, was established in the new Republic of Serbia, consisting of the Public Security Service, which oversaw the milicija (later renamed to policija (police) in 1996) and the State Security Service. The State Security Service also maintained an Aviation Unit with a fleet of helicopters. 

The Ministry of Internal Affairs helicopter fleet included the Bell 206B/L, Soko Gazelle SA-341/342, Bell AB-212, Aerospatiale SA-365N Dauphin, Mi-17 and Mi-24.

The RDB took part in combat operations in Bosnia and Herzegovina and Croatia in support of ethnic Serb forces – often flying without any markings or only marked with the Serbian flag. In 1997, RDB combat units were reorganised into a Brigade level unit: the Unit for Special Forces (JSO), including the Aviation Unit. The JSO took part in numerous combat operations during the escalating Kosovo and Metochia crisis. Mi-24s were used to attack rebel training camps and hundreds of transport and medevac flight were carried out. During the NATO Operation Allied Force in 1999, JSO helicopters continued to fly liaison and medivac missions. During the NATO bombing, no helicopters were damaged but the fleet hangar was destroyed.

In 1998, a Sikorsky S-76 had entered service in the fleet for VIP transport.

In October 2001, the helicopters were publicly presented for the first time, during a joint exercise with the Armed Forces of Serbia and Montenegro.

In 2002, the Ministry of Internal Affairs was re-organised following the dissolving of the RDB consequently the RDB Aviation Unit was integrated into the police Helicopter Unit. The military helicopters used by the RDB the Mi-24 and the Mi-17 were transferred to the Air Force.

Roles

The Helicopter Unit undertakes a wide variety of roles for the police and the MUP including:
Transportation of people and assets
Assisting the Police Directorate
Border monitoring in co-operation with the Border Police Directorate
Traffic control in co-operation with the Traffic Police Directorate
Supporting the Special Anti–Terrorist Unit including parachuting and the Gendarmery
VIP transport
Medical evacuation
Search and rescue
Aerial firefighting

The Helicopter Unit has its own flight school to trains its pilots and also has its own aviation technicians to service its helicopters.

Helicopters

Current fleet

Retired fleet

See also
Police aviation

References

External links
 Serbia police aviation – aeroflight.co.uk

Aviation in Serbia
Ministry of Internal Affairs (Serbia)
Police aviation